Early European Farmers (EEF), First European Farmers (FEF), Neolithic European Farmers, Ancient Aegean Farmers, or Anatolian Neolithic Farmers (ANF) are names used to describe a distinct group of early Neolithic farmers who brought agriculture to Europe. Although the spread of agriculture from the Middle East to Europe has long been recognised through archaeology, it is only recent advances in archaeogenetics that have confirmed that this spread was strongly correlated with a migration of these farmers, and was not just a cultural exchange.

The Early European Farmers moved into Europe from Anatolia through the Balkans from around 7,000 BC, and gradually spread north and westwards. Genetic studies have confirmed that they interbred with the existing inhabitants of the region, the Western Hunter-Gatherers (WHGs) and they coexisted and traded in some locales, although evidence suggests that the relationship was not always peaceful. Over the course of the next 4,000 years or so, Europe was transformed into agricultural communities, and WHGs were displaced to the margins.

During the Chalcolithic and early Bronze Age, the Early European Farmer cultures were overwhelmed by new migrations from a group identified as Western Steppe Herders (WSHs) or Yamnaya. Yamnaya culture is associated with the spread of Indo-European languages, and so the group is sometimes known as Proto-Indo-Europeans. Once again the populations interbred and EEF ancestry is common in modern European populations.

Overview

It has been discovered that populations of the Anatolian Neolithic derived a significant portion of their ancestry from the Anatolian hunter-gatherers (AHG), suggesting that agriculture was adopted in site by these hunter-gatherers and not spread by demic diffusion into the region. Ancestors of AHGs and EEFs are believed to have split off from Western Hunter-Gatherers (WHGs) around 43,000 BC, and to have split from Caucasian Hunter-Gatherers (CHGs) around 23,000 BC.

They appear to have migrated from Anatolia to the Balkans in large numbers during the 7th millennium BC, where they almost completely replaced the WHGs. The Y-DNA of EEFs was typically types of haplogroup G2a, and to a lesser extent H, T, J, C1a2 and E1b1, while their mtDNA was diverse. In the Balkans, the EEFs appear to have divided into two wings, who expanded further west into Europe along the Danube (Linear Pottery culture) or the western Mediterranean (Cardial Ware). Large parts of Northern Europe and Eastern Europe nevertheless remained unsettled by EEFs. During the Middle Neolithic there was a largely male-driven resurgence of WHG ancestry among many EEF-derived communities, leading to increasing frequencies of the hunter-gatherer paternal haplogroups among them.

During the Chalcolithic and early Bronze Age, the EEF-derived cultures of Europe were overwhelmed by successive invasions of Western Steppe Herders (WSHs) from the Pontic–Caspian steppe, who carried about 60% Eastern Hunter-Gatherer (EHG) and 40% Caucasus Hunter-Gatherer (CHG) admixture. These invasions led to EEF paternal DNA lineages in Europe being almost entirely replaced with EHG/WSH paternal DNA (mainly R1b and R1a). EEF maternal DNA (mainly haplogroup N) also heavily declined, being supplanted by steppe lineages, suggesting the migrations involved both males and females from the steppe. EEF mtDNA however remained frequent, suggesting admixture between WSH males and EEF females.

EEF ancestry remains widespread throughout Europe, ranging from about 60% near the Mediterranean Sea (with a peak of 65%  in the island of Sardinia) and diminishing northwards to about 10% in northern Scandinavia. According to more recent studies the highest EEF ancestry found in modern Europeans ranges from 67% to over 80% in modern Sardinians, Italians, Greeks and Iberians, with the lowest EEF ancestry found in modern Europeans ranging from 35% to 40% in modern Finns and Balts.

Physical appearance
European hunter-gatherers were much taller than EEFs, and the replacement of European hunter-gatherers by EEFs resulted in a dramatic decrease in genetic height throughout Europe. During the later phases of the Neolithic, height increased among European farmers, probably due to increasing admixture with hunter-gatherers. During the Late Neolithic and Bronze Age, further reductions of EEF ancestry in Europe due to migrations of peoples with steppe-related ancestry is associated with further increases in height. High frequencies of EEF ancestry in Southern Europe might partly explain the shortness of Southern Europeans as compared to Northern Europeans, who carry increased levels of steppe-related ancestry.

The Early European Farmers are believed to have been mostly dark haired and dark eyed, and light skinned.

Studies

Ancient human genomes suggest three ancestral populations for present-day Europeans 
 identified Early European Farmers (EEFs) as a distinct ancestral component in a study published in Nature in 2014. Along with Ancient North Eurasians (ANEs) and Western Hunter-Gatherers, EEFs were determined to be one of the three major ancestral populations of modern-Europeans. About 44% of EEF ancestry was determined to come from a "Basal Eurasian" population that split prior to the diversification of other non-African lineages. Ötzi was identified as EEF. EEFs were determined to be largely of Near Eastern origin, with slight WHG admixture. It was through their EEF ancestors that most modern Southern Europeans acquired their WHG ancestry. EEF ancestry in modern Europe ranged from 30%  in the Baltic States to 90% near the Mediterranean Sea.

Ancient mitochondrial DNA from the northern fringe of the Neolithic farming expansion in Europe sheds light on the dispersion process 
 found that the people of the Funnelbeaker culture of southern Scandinavia were largely of EEF descent, with slight hunter-gatherer admixture, suggesting that the emergence of the Neolithic in Scandinavia was a result of human migration from the south. The Funnelbeakers were found to be genetically highly different from people of the neighboring hunter-gatherer Pitted Ware culture; the latter carried no EEF admixture and were instead genetically similar to other European hunter-gatherers.

Massive migration from the steppe was a source for Indo-European languages in Europe 
 found that the amount of WHG ancestry among EEFs had significantly increased during the Middle Neolithic, documenting a WHG resurgence. It was found that EEF Y-DNA was typically types haplogroup G2a, while their mtDNA was diverse. During the Late Neolithic and Early Bronze Age, G2a nearly disappears from Europe and is replaced with types of R1b and R1a, indicating a massive migration of people out of the Pontic–Caspian steppe. It has been suggested that this migration might be connected to the spread of Indo-European languages in Europe.

Autosomal EEF ancestry in modern Europeans was calculated, with Southern Europeans possessing the highest amounts of EEF ancestry ranging from 65% to 90%.

A common genetic origin for early farmers from Mediterranean Cardial and Central European LBK cultures 

 found that the people of the Linear Pottery culture (LBK) in Central Europe and people of the Cardial Ware culture along the Mediterranean coast were descended from a homogenous community of EEFs with a common origin in the Balkans. EEF ancestors of the LBK people were expected to have migrated into Central Europe along the Danube river, while EEF ancestors of the Cardials were expected to have migrated along the Mediterranean coast. The Cardials appeared to have acquired a significant amount of hunter-gatherer ancestry during this process. Among modern populations, Sardinians and Basque people were found to harbor the largest amount of EEF ancestry, which they probably acquired through descent from the Cardials.

Upper Palaeolithic genomes reveal deep roots of modern Eurasians 
 found that the ancestors of the EEF had split off from WHG around 43,000 BC, possibly through a migration of WHG into Europe. Around 23,000 BC, EEFs ancestors had again split into EEFs and Caucasian Hunter-Gatherers (CHGs). CHG admixture has been detected among people of the Yamnaya culture, who expanded massively throughout Europe from around 3,000 BC.

Genome-wide patterns of selection in 230 ancient Eurasians
 found EEFs to be closely genetically related to Neolithic farmers of Anatolia. EEFs were found to have 7–11% more WHG ancestry than their Anatolian ancestors. This suggested that the EEFs belonged to a common ancestral population before their expansion into Europe. With regards Y-DNA, EEF males typically carried types of G2a. The study found that most modern Europeans can be modeled as a mixture of WHGs, EEFs and descendants of the Yamnaya culture. The Anatolian ancestors of the EEFs were found to be genetically different from modern peoples of the Near East, and were instead shifted towards Europe.

Middle Neolithic and Chalcolithic peoples of Iberia were found to be genetically similar to each other, and harbored reduced levels of EEF and increased levels of WHG ancestry compared to Early Neolithic individuals of the region. Peoples of the Srubnaya culture and the earlier Sintashta culture were found to harbor c. 15% EEF ancestry, suggesting that these cultures emerged through the eastward migration of Central European peoples with steppe-related ancestry.

The neolithic transition in the Baltic was not driven by admixture with early European farmers and extensive farming in Estonia started through a sex-biased migration from the steppe
 found no evidence of EEF admixture among Neolithic populations of the eastern Baltic and the East European forest steppe, suggesting that the hunter-gatherers of these regions avoided genetic replacement while adopting Neolithic cultural traditions.   found that the people of the subsequent Corded Ware culture in the eastern Baltic carried steppe and hunter-gatherer-related paternal and autosomal ancestry, and some EEF maternal ancestry.

Ancient X chromosomes reveal contrasting sex bias in Neolithic and Bronze Age Eurasian migrations
 found no significant evidence sex-bias in the admixure between EEFs and hunter-gatherers during the initial EEF expansion into Europe, although a larger number of hunter-gatherer females may have been incorporated into EEF communities during this phase. During Late Neolithic and Bronze Age however, a dramatic sex-bias was detected, suggesting heavy mixing between migrating males with steppe-related ancestry and local females with EEF ancestry.

Parallel palaeogenomic transects reveal complex genetic history of early European farmers
 examined the genetic history of EEFs. It was found that the initial westward spread of the EEFs from the Balkans was accompanied only by slight admixture with hunter-gatherer populations. Peoples of Middle Neolithic and Chalcolithic Iberia were found to carry about 75% EEF ancestry and 25% WHG ancestry, more WHG ancestry than Early Neolithic Iberians. Significant reductions in EEF ancestry during the later phases of the Neolithic was also observed in Central Europe, particularly in the northern and eastern parts of the region.

The genomic history of Southeastern Europe

 found that the EEFs had initially spread agriculture throughout Europe largely without admixture with local WHGs. It was proposed that this process had started through a single massive migration from Anatolia into the Balkans in the 7th millennium BC. The EEFs had subsequently split into two wings, one which spread northwards along the Danube through the Linear Pottery culture, and another which spread westward across the Mediterranean coast through the Cardial Ware culture. By 5600 BC, these cultures had brought agriculture to Iberia and Central Europe.

It was found that there was a significant increase hunter-gatherer ancestry in Iberia, Central Europe and the Balkans during the Middle Neolithic. While the slight mixture between EEFs and hunter-gatherers in the Early Neolithic appeared to have happened without sex-bias, increases in hunter-gatherer ancestry during the Middle Neolithic appeared to be largely the result of males with hunter-gatherer ancestry mixing with females with EEF ancestry. This conclusion was derived from the fact that examined Middle Neolithic Europeans overwhelmingly carried hunter-gatherer paternal lineages and EEF maternal lineages. Hunter-gatherer ancestry was even higher among Late Neolithic samples from the Cucuteni–Trypillia culture, Funnelbeaker culture and Globular Amphora culture, which carried about 75-80% EEF ancestry while being dominated by hunter-gatherer paternal lineages.

In the southern Balkans, the Middle Neolithic farmers display reduced levels of EEF ancestry increased amounts of ancestry related to Caucasian Hunter-Gatherers (CHGs), suggesting further gene flow from Anatolia, which continued into the Bronze Age.

Ancient genomes from North Africa evidence prehistoric migrations to the Maghreb from both the Levant and Europe
 estimated that examined individuals at the Late Neolithic site of Kelif el Boroud, Morocco, dated c. 3000 BC, carried about 50% EEF ancestry and 50% North African ancestry, were genetically predisposed to have light skin and light eyes, and entirely carried paternal and maternal lineages associated with EEFs. It was suggested that EEF ancestry had entered North Africa through Cardial Ware colonists from Iberia sometime between 5000 and 3000 BC. The examined samples of Kelif el Boroud were found to be closely related to Guanches of the Canary Islands. Additional amounts of EEF ancestry may have been brought to North Africa by the Bell Beaker culture. The authors of the study suggested that the Berbers of Morocco carried a substantial amount of EEF ancestry before the establishment of Roman colonies in Berber Africa.

Mitochondrial genomes reveal an east to west cline of steppe ancestry in Corded Ware populations
 found that while females with steppe-related ancestry contributed to the formation of the Corded Ware culture in the eastern Baltic, the maternal lineages of Corded Ware culture on its western fringes were largely of EEF origin, suggesting that mixing that the westward expansion of the Corded Ware culture was characterized by the mixing of males with steppe-related ancestry and women with EEF ancestry.

The genomic history of the Iberian Peninsula over the past 8000 years
 examined the genetic history of the Iberian Peninsula. It was found that the peoples of Early Neolithic Iberia were largely of EEF ancestry. Peoples of the Middle Neolithic and Copper Age were found to harbor increased levels of WHG ancestry as compared to the Early Neolithic. Hunter-gatherer admixture was found to be higher in northern and central Iberia. Olalde argues that during the Bronze Age Iberia experienced a significant genetic turnover, with 100% of the paternal ancestry and 40% of the overall ancestry being replaced by peoples with steppe-related ancestry.

Megalithic tombs in western and northern Neolithic Europe were linked to a kindred society
 examined the remains of 24 individuals buried in megaliths in northern and western Europe during the Middle Neolithic. They were found to be largely of EEF ancestry, although with significant amount of hunter-gatherer admixture, which appeared to be male-derived. The 17 samples of Y-DNA extracted belonged exclusively to the paternal haplogroup I, particularly I2, which are lineages associated with European hunter-gatherers. The evidence suggested that these societies were strongly patrilineal and socially stratified.

Ancient genomes indicate population replacement in Early Neolithic Britain
 found that the farmers of the Neolithic British Isles had entered the region through a mass migration c. 4000 BC. They carried about 80% EEF and 20% WHG ancestry and were found to be closely related to Neolithic peoples of Iberia, which implies that they were descended from agriculturalists who had moved westwards from the Balkans along the Mediterranean coast. The arrival of farming populations led to the almost complete replacement of the native WHGs of the British Isles, who did not experience a genetic resurgence in the succeeding centuries.

Genetic history from the Middle Neolithic to present on the Mediterranean island of Sardinia
 found that people of the Bronze Age Nuragic civilization of Sardinia carried about 80% EEF ancestry and 20% WHG ancestry. Strong evidence of genetic continuity was detected between Neolithic Sardinians and Bronze Age Sardinians.

A massacre of early Neolithic farmers in the high Pyrenees at Els Trocs, Spain
 examined the remains of 9 farmers who had been systematically massacred at the site of Els Trocs, Spain c. 5300 BC. They were found to be genetically different from contemporary populations of Iberia, and were instead more similar to EEFs of Central Europe. The authors of the study suggested that they were migrant farmers from Central Europe who had been victims of an ethnic cleansing carried out by local hunter-gatherer groups, or by other (either local or also migrant) farmer groups seeking to defend their territories.

Ancient genome-wide DNA from France highlights the complexity of interactions between Mesolithic hunter-gatherers and Neolithic farmers
 found that Neolithic farmers in Western Europe had higher amounts of WHG ancestry than their Central European contemporaries. Neolithic farmers of France and Iberia were found to be closely related to contemporary farmers of the British Isles, with whom they shared a relatively large amount of WHG ancestry. Examined farmers of Early Neolithic southern France exclusively carried the hunter-gatherer-derived paternal haplogroup I2, while the maternal lineages were mainly of EEF origin. Levels of Hunter-gatherer admixture among early farmers of France increased further during Middle Neolithic, reaching as high as 30% at some sites entirely dominated by hunter-gatherer paternal lineages. It was suggested that the increase was a result of migrations towards the northeast by farmers with elevated levels of hunter-gatherer ancestry.

Ancient genomes from present-day France unveil 7,000 years of its demographic history
 found that earliest farmers of modern-day France were genetically similar to the Central European agriculturalists of the Linear Pottery Culture. It was found that the observed resurgence of WHG ancestry among European farmers in the Middle Neolithic happened very early and was relatively large in modern-day France.

A dynastic elite in monumental Neolithic society
 examined a large number of individuals buried in Neolithic Ireland. They were found to be largely of EEF ancestry (with WHG admixture), and were closely related to peoples of Neolithic Britain and Iberia. It was found that the Neolithic peoples of Ireland had almost entirely replaced the native Irish Hunter-Gatherers through a rapid maritime colonization. Peoples of the Irish and British Neolithic carried almost entirely the paternal haplogroup I-M284 (a WHG Y-haplogroup), suggesting that these societies were strongly patrilineal. A Neolithic royal buried at Newgrange was found to be highly inbred and possibly the product of an incestual relationship, suggesting that this community was highly socially stratified and dominated by a line of powerful "god-kings".

See also
 Neolithic Europe
 Neolithic decline
 Anatolian hunter-gatherers

References

Bibliography

Further reading

 
 
 
 
 
 
 
 
 
 

EEF
Genetic history of Europe
Neolithic Europe
Modern human genetic history